The Miaoli Pottery Museum or Miaoli Ceramics Museum is a museum of pottery in Gongguan Township, Miaoli County, Taiwan.

History
The construction of the museum was completed by the end of 2005.

Architecture
The museum is housed in a 2-story building and spreads across a 2 hectares of area. It is located inside the Miaoli Travel Panorama Center, which also consists of a tourist information center, a restaurant and a gift shop. The museum includes the following themes, which are Home of Ceramics: Miaoli, Life of the Old Masterm Ceramics in Miaoli, Urn and Decorative Ceramics, Kilns in Miaoli, Traditional Ceramic Techniques and Modern Wood Burning.

Exhibitions
The museum exhibits various relics of pottery and art works that represents the history and culture of Miaoli County. It also features special pottery exhibitions.

Transportation
The museum is accessible east from Tongluo Station of the Taiwan Railways.

See also
 List of museums in Taiwan

References

External links
 

2005 establishments in Taiwan
Ceramics museums in Taiwan
Museums established in 2005
Museums in Miaoli County